Choa Chu Kang Cemetery Complex (or Chua Chu Kang Cemetery) (Chinese: 蔡厝港坟场 Malay: Kawasan Perkuburan Choa Chu Kang) is the largest cemetery in Singapore. Located in the west of the island in close proximity to the Tengah Air Base and at the confluence of the Old Choa Chu Kang Road, Lim Chu Kang Road and Jalan Bahar, it comprises the Chinese, Christian, Ahmadiyya Jama'at, Muslim, Parsi, Baháʼí, Jewish, Hindu and Lawn cemeteries. It is currently the only cemetery in Singapore which allows burials.

Also within its grounds, are several columbaria, including the state-run Choa Chu Kang Columbarium, and two private facilities, namely The Garden of Remembrance, a Christian columbarium and Nirvana Memorial Park, a Buddhist facility.

History 
In 2017, as part of the expansion plans for Tengah Air Base, the cemetery will be reduced in size from 318ha to 100ha. Affected graves, consisting 45,500 Chinese graves and 35,000 Muslim graves, would be exhumed in phases with the remains cremated or reinterred in other parts of the cemetery.

Garden of Peace 
The Garden of Peace, an ash scattering garden, to be situated in Chua Chu Kang Cemetery was introduced in 2019 and will only be opened in 2020. The garden is open to people of all faiths. Ashes are scattered at designated lanes, allowing the ashes to mix with the soil below. Watering equipment are provided to allow family members to mix the ashes with the soil.

The garden was opened on 17 May 2021.

Transport 
SMRT Services 172 and 975 passes by Choa Chu Kang Cemetery everyday, whereas SBS Transit Service 405 is the only service which goes into the cemetery that operates during festive periods only.

References

External links
 

Cemeteries in Singapore
Cemetery
Western Water Catchment